Mark Green or Greene may refer to:

Sportspeople
Mark Green (American football) (born 1967), NFL running back
Mark Green (ice hockey) (1967–2004), American professional ice hockey player
Mark Green (racing driver) (born 1959), veteran driver in the NASCAR Busch Series
Mark Greene (footballer) (born 1959), Australian rules footballer

Politicians
Mark Green (Wisconsin politician) (born 1960), member of the United States House of Representatives from Wisconsin
Mark E. Green (born 1964), member of the United States House of Representatives from Tennessee
Mark J. Green (born 1945), lawyer and New York City Public Advocate

Other people
Mark Green (bishop) (1917–2009), bishop of Aston
Mark A. Greene, American archivist, director of American Heritage Center
Mark F. Green (born 1953), American lawyer from Oklahoma
Mark I. Greene, professor of pathology
Mark Lee Green (born 1947), American mathematician
Mark M. Green (born 1937), professor of Chemistry at NYU
Mark N. Greene, CEO of OpenLink

Fictional characters
Mark Greene, fictional character on the television series ER

See also
 Mark Greenaway
 Mark Greenblatt
 Mark Greenstreet
 Mark Greenwald
 Mark Greenwold